The North Korea national under-16 basketball team is a national basketball team of North Korea, administered by the Amateur Basketball Association of DPR of Korea.
It represents the country in international under-16 (under age 16) basketball competitions.

It appeared at the 2015 FIBA Asia Under-16 Championship qualification stage.

See also

North Korea men's national basketball team

References

External links
Archived records of North Korea team participations

Basketball teams in North Korea
Men's national under-16 basketball teams
Basketball